Lesly St. Fleur (born 21 March 1989) is a Bahamian international football player, who plays as a striker for Jamaica National Premier League side Montego Bay United and the Bahamas national team.

Club career
St. Fleur was born in Haiti, and has played his club football for Bears FC in the Bahamas. He briefly played for Jamaican side Sporting Central Academy in 2011, but left them to return to the Bahamas in November 2011 while joint top goalscorer of the team. He then returned to Jamaica in 2012 to play for  Montego Bay United.

International career
St. Fleur made his debut for the Bahamas in a September 2006 Caribbean Cup qualification match against the Cayman Islands and has, as of March 2016, earned a total of 12 caps, scoring 6 goals. He has represented his country in 7 FIFA World Cup qualification games. In a 2014 FIFA World Cup Qualifier in July 2011 the Bahamas beat Turks & Caicos Islands 6-0. Of the six goals scored by the national team, he scored an unbelievable five goals. This single match shot him to the top of the Bahamas' goal scoring charts with six goals. He has also represented the Bahamas in international beach soccer.

Career statistics

International

International goals
Scores and results list Bahamas' goal tally first.

References

External links

1989 births
Living people
Association football forwards
Bahamian footballers
Haitian footballers
Sportspeople from Nassau, Bahamas
Haitian emigrants to the Bahamas
Bahamian expatriate footballers
Haitian expatriate footballers
Expatriate soccer players in Canada
Bahamian expatriate sportspeople in Canada
Haitian expatriate sportspeople in Canada
Expatriate footballers in Jamaica
Bahamian expatriate sportspeople in Jamaica
Haitian expatriate sportspeople in Jamaica
Bears FC players
Milltown FC players
Sporting Central Academy players
Montego Bay United F.C. players
BFA Senior League players
Canadian Soccer League (1998–present) players
National Premier League players
Bahamas international footballers
Bahamas under-20 international footballers
Bahamas youth international footballers
Beach soccer players